Boloria angarensis  is a small butterfly found in the  Palearctic  that belongs to the browns family.

Subspecies
Boloria angarensis angarensis Transbaikalia, South Siberia
Boloria angarensis herzi   (Wnukowsky, 1927)  North Transbaikalia, Far East Yakutia
Boloria angarensis sedychi    (Weiss, 1964)   Polar Urals, Yamal Peninsula
Boloria angarensis alticola    (Sushkin & Tschetverikov, 1907)   Sayan, Tuva (mountains)
Boloria angarensis hakutozana    (Matsumura, 1927)   Amur, Ussuri, N.Korea, NE.China
Boloria angarensis miakei    (Matsumura, 1919)   Sakhalin

Description from Seitz

A. angarensis Ersch. (67h). About the same size as the previous [A. iphigenia Graes] ; the forewing less elongate. The underside of the hindwing bears a very close resemblance to that of A. selenis sibirica , but the costal spot of the median band is essentially different in shape, as shown in the figure. Moreover, angarensis has a row of  silvery marginal spots, which are absent in sibirica or only indicated. The female larger and paler. — In Amurland, in June, locally very common.

Biology
The larva feeds on Vaccinium.

References

Boloria
Butterflies described in 1870
Butterflies of Asia